Zsolt Gombos (born 27 February 1968 in Zalaegerszeg) is a Hungarian former wrestler who competed in the 1992 Summer Olympics, in the 1996 Summer Olympics, and in the 2000 Summer Olympics.

References

External links
 

1968 births
Living people
Olympic wrestlers of Hungary
Wrestlers at the 1992 Summer Olympics
Wrestlers at the 1996 Summer Olympics
Wrestlers at the 2000 Summer Olympics
Hungarian male sport wrestlers
People from Zalaegerszeg
Sportspeople from Zala County